"Around My Heart" is a 1988 pop song performed by German singer Sandra. It was written by Hubert Kemmler, Markus Löhr, Sör Otto's, Frank Peterson and Klaus Hirschburger, and produced by Michael Cretu. The song was released as the fourth single from Sandra's third studio album Into a Secret Land in spring 1989 and was a top 20 hit in Germany and Switzerland. It also reached no. 12 on the German airplay chart.

The music video was directed by Bulle Bernd. The clip was released on Sandra's VHS video compilation 18 Greatest Hits in 1992 as well as the 2003 DVD The Complete History.

In 1999, a remix of the song was released on Sandra's compilation My Favourites. The track was remixed again for her 2006 compilation Reflections and released as a promotional radio single in Poland where it became a top 5 airplay hit.

Formats and track listings
 7" single
A. "Around My Heart" (Single Version) – 3:11
B. "Around My Drums" (Instrumental) – 3:13

 12" maxi single
A. "Around My Heart" (Extended Version) – 6:02
B1. "Around My Drums" (Instrumental) – 3:13
B2. "Around My Heart" (Single Version) – 3:11

 CD maxi single
"Around My Heart" (Single Version) – 3:11
"Around My Heart" (Extended Version) – 6:02
"Around My Drums" (Instrumental) – 3:13

Charts

Weekly charts

Year-end charts

References

External links
 "Around My Heart" at Discogs
 The official Sandra YouTube channel

1988 songs
1989 singles
Sandra (singer) songs
Song recordings produced by Michael Cretu
Songs written by Frank Peterson
Songs written by Hubert Kemmler
Songs written by Klaus Hirschburger
Songs written by Markus Löhr
Virgin Records singles